The  (Sanskrit: "Scripture in Six Parts") is the foremost and oldest Digambara Jain sacred text.

According to Digambara tradition, the original canonical scriptures of the Jains were totally lost within a few centuries of Nirvana of Mahavira. Therefore the Ṣaṭkhaṅḍāgama is the most revered Digambara text that has been given the status of āgama. The importance of the Ṣaṭkhaṅḍāgama to the Digambaras can be judged by the fact that, the day its Dhavalā commentary was completed, it is commemorated on the Śrūta Pañcami, a day when all the Jain scriptures are venerated. The Ṣaṭkhaṅḍāgama, the first āgama, is also called the "Prathama Śrūta-Skandha", while the Pancha Paramāgama by Kundakunda are referred to as the second āgama or Dvitiya Śrūta-Skandha.

Origins
It is said to have been based on oral teaching of the Digambara monk, acharya Dharasena (1st Century CE). According to the tradition, alarmed at the gradual dwindling of scriptural knowledge, he summoned two monks, Pushpadanta and Bhūtabali to a cave, known as Chandra Gupha, or the Moon Cave, his retreat in mount Girnar, Gujarat, and communicated what he remembered out of originally vast extent of sacred Jain writings. He taught them portions of the fifth Anga Viahapannatti (Vyakhya Prajnapti) and of the twelfth Anga Ditthivada (Drstivada). These were subsequently reduced to writing in Sutra form by his pupils. Pushpadanta composed the first 177 Sutras and his colleague Bhutabali wrote the rest, the total being 6000 Sutras.

Dhavala Commentary

Achrya Virasena received the ancient Shatkhandagama and Kashyaprabhrita texts through the lineage tradition. At Vatagram, he wrote a 72,000 shloka commentary on Shatkhandagama (known as Dhavala and the last section called Mahadhavala) and 20,000 shloka commentary the Kashyaprabhrita (known as Jayadhavala). After he passed away his disciple Acharya Jinasena completed the Jayadhavala commentary by adding another 20,000 shlokas. Both of the commentaries use both Sanskrit and Prakit. Jayadhavala was finished during the rule of the Rashtrakuta ruler Amoghavarsha in 838 AD (or Jagatunga according to some scholars)

The palm leaf writings of this long work, were preserved in the Digambara holy place of Shravanabelagola at the Siddhanta Basadi. Later they were shifted to Mudabidri, a temple town in South-West Karnataka. The palm leaf manuscript, itself written during the Rashtrakura rule, is still preserved. Some of the leaves contain beautiful paintings of historical importance A copy was reputed to have been at the Malked (Manyakhet) Mutt, but that has not survived. At Mudabidri, these scriptures were treated with great reverence, but became mere objects of worship, and unavailable to outside scholars. Ordinary householders were not permitted to study these. Digambara āgamas like Satkhandāgama and the Kasāyapāhuda were in a state of neglect and were not studied or made available to the community.

Revival to the Modern Society
With the support of Manikchand of Sholapur during 1896 to 1920, the Moodbidrai manuscript were transcribed in modern Nagari and Kannad scripts, without the knowledge of the Moodbidri temple trustees.

In the 20th century, Dr. Hiralal Jain was one of the first few lay scholars who decided to retrieve the āgamas, and bring to light with systematic editing and proof reading. With the help of his scholar friends like Pandit Nathuram Premi and Jamunaprasada Sub-Judge, he raised the funds to publish the āgamas, and set out to extricate the āgamas from Mudabidri, where the original handwritten Prakrit manuscripts had lain for centuries, unstudied. Dr Hiralal Jain, Pt Nathuram Premi and Jamunaprasada sub-judge together managed to convince Seth Sitabray Gulabray, a wealthy land-owner from Vidisha (Bundelkhand, Madhya Pradesh) belonging to the Paravāra community, to donate Rs. 30,000 for the cause of editing and publishing the Satkhandāgama along with its Dhavalā commentary, expertly edited and accompanied by an excellent Hindi translation.
This donation enabled Dr Hiralal Jain to work together with Dr. A.N. Upadhye, close friend and a scholar of Prakrit. Dr. Hiralal Jain brought together a team of scholars including, Pt. Phulchandra Shastri, Pt. Kailashchandra Shastri, Sh. Sheryansh Kumar Jain Shastri, Pt. Hiralal Shastri and Pt. Balachandra Shastri started the project of revival and study of the Digambara āgama. These scholars had to face stiff opposition from the monks and the traditional srāvakas who were opposed to the very concept of printing religious scriptures as they felt that printing would undermine the purity of the scripture.

In a period of twenty years, the Satkhandāgama, along with its massive Dhavalā and Mahādhavalā commentaries was edited from the original palm leaf manuscripts and published after very careful proof reading in consultation with senior Jaina scholars like Pt. Nathuram Premi and Pt. Devakinandan Nayak.

Subject matter of the Agama and its commentaries
The Satkhandāgama, as the name suggests, is a scripture in six parts.
The six parts are:
 Jiva Sthana (Categories of Living Beings)
 Kshudraka Bandha (Minutiae of Bondage)
 Bandhasvamitva (Ownership of Bondage)
 Vedana (Perception)
 Vargana (Divisions of Karmas)
 Mahabandha (Great Bondage)
Satkhandāgama postulates karma theory, using a number of technical terms defining various concepts and mathematical notions. The first three parts deal with the karma philosophy from the view point of the soul which is the agent of the bondage and the last three section discusses the nature and extent of the karmas.

The commentary on the first five parts is known as the Dhavalā. The commentary on the sixth part is known as the Mahādhavalā.

Dhavalā is divided into 16 sections which is as follows:
 Volume One, Jivasthana - Categories of Living Beings
Book 1 :  Satprarupana (Teaching on the Entities) Part - 1
Book 2: Satprarupana (Teaching on the Entities) Part - 2
Book 3: Dravyapramananugama (Teaching on the Entities)
Book 4: Kshetra - Sparshana - Kalanugama (Location, Touch and Time)
Book 5: Antara - Bhava - Alpabahuttva (Gap, State, Few or Many)
Book 6: Culika (Appendix)
 Volume Two : Ksudrakabandha - Minutiae of Bondage
 Volume Three : Bandhasvamittva - Ownership of Bondage
 Volume Four, Vedana - Perception
Book 1: Krtianuyogdvara (Acts as Doors of Disquisition)
 Book 2: Vedana Kshetra - Vedana Kala - Vedana Dravya (Area, Time and Object of Perception)
Book 3: Vedana Kshetra - Vedana Kala (Area and Time of Perception)
Book 4: Vedana Bhava Vidhana (Directive on State of Perception)
 Volume Five Vargana  - Divisions of Karma
Book 1: Sparshakarmaprakrti Anuyoga  (Examination of the Nature of Karmic Sensation)
Book 2: Bandhana Anuyoga (Examination of Bondage)
Book 3: Nibandhanadi Chatura Anuyoga (Four-part Examination of the Fastening of Karmas)
Book 4: Moksadi Chaturdasha Anuyoga (Fourteen-part Examination of Liberation, etc.)

Mahādhavalā the commentary on sixth section called Mahabandha has seven books. The other Digambara āgama, the Kasāyapāhuda, also has a voluminous commentary. It is called the Jaya Dhavalā. All three commentaries were composed by ācārya Virasena and ācārya Jinasena (8th century CE). The text and its commentaries preserved on the palm leaf manuscripts run into some 120,000 verses.

One interesting fact about the Satkhandāgama is that it is believed that the 5 pada Namokāra Mantra is believed to have been composed by ācārya Pushpadanta as the mangalacarana (opening verse, often an invocation to god for the successful completion of the text) to the Satkhandāgama. Before this work, only the 2 pada Namokāra Mantra has been found in inscriptions. Hence, there is reason to believe that ācārya Pushpadanta was the first person to compose the 5 pada Namokāra Mantra. The Satkhandāgama is a highly complex work, adumbrating the Jaina karma siddhānta. Although it is a Digambara work, it is seen as an authoritative work on the Jaina karma theory by all Jains.

Hindi and English translations

The first five parts of the Satkhandāgama along with the Dhavalā commentary and Hindi translation, running into 16 Volumes, was first published from Vidisha itself, by the family of Shrimant Seth Sitabray Gulabray. But is now published by the Jaina Sanskriti Sanrakshak Sangh in Solapur and distributed by Hindi Granth Karyalay, Mumbai.
The Mahādhavalā commentary and Hindi translation, running into 7 Volumes, is published from New Delhi by Bharatiya Jñanapitha.
The Kasāyapāhuda along with the JayaDhavalā commentary and Hindi translation, running into 16 Volumes, is published by Jaina Sangha, Mathura and distributed by Hindi Granth Karyalay, Mumbai.

Popular English Translations are  :-
Satkhandagama : Dhavala (Jivasthana) Satparupana-I (Enunciation of Existence-I)
An English Translation of Part 1 of the Dhavala Commentary on the Satkhandagama of Acarya Pushpadanta & Bhutabali Dhavala commentary by Acarya Virasena English tr. by Prof. Nandlal Jain, Ed. by Prof. Ashok Jain,

Notes

References

 
 
 
 
 
 
 

Jain texts
Agamas